Herbert David Louch (4 January 1875 – 29 August 1936) was an Australian rules footballer who played with St Kilda in the Victorian Football League (VFL).

References

External links 		
		

1875 births
1936 deaths
Australian rules footballers from Victoria (Australia)
St Kilda Football Club players